Karan Mehra  (born 10 September 1982) is an Indian television actor, model and fashion designer he is known for his performance as main lead Naitik Singhania in Yeh Rishta Kya Kehlata Hai, one of the longest-running Indian television serials. He is also known for Sumit Mishra in  Khatmal E Ishq, Do phool ek maali. One of the highest-paid actors in Hindi television industry, he was also a contestant on Bigg Boss 10 (2016–2017).

Early life 
Mehra was born on 10 September 1982 in Jalandhar, Punjab in a Punjabi family. His family moved to Delhi when he was very young. Mehra studied fashion designing from National Institute of Fashion Technology (NIFT), Delhi and studied at Apeejay School, Noida. He was the topper in his batch at the University. After his 12th grade, Mehra worked as a summer trainee at Dominos Pizza.

Career
Mehra came to Mumbai and started working for directors Rajkumar Hirani and Ram Gopal Verma as an assistant in four movies. He then appeared in the movie Love Story 2050. After that, he started doing modelling and TV commercials. In 2009, while training in acting classes, he got the role of Naitik Singhania in Yeh Rishta Kya Kehlata Hai. He got a big break from the show, continued it for nearly seven-and-a-half years until June 2016 and quit then owing health issues. Along with this, he participated in the dance reality shows Nach Baliye 5 and Nach Baliye Shriman v/s Shrimati with his wife Nisha Rawal  in 2012–13.

In October 2016, Mehra entered the Bigg Boss house as a contestant with his co-star Rohan Mehra. He was evicted in the fifth week as the first celebrity to be evicted.

He then did a short stint in Khatmal E Ishq as Sumit Mishra.

Mehra's new movie Basthi Hai Sasthi is about stepping up game and leaning how to cope with reality. He announced it on an interview, and advertised it on TV show Saath Nibhana Saathiya in 2016. It was supposed to release in 2017, however release dates have been pushed back to 2018.

In October 2020, Mehra started shooting for the upcoming Zee Punjabi soap Mawaan Thandiyan Chawan in Chandigarh.

In November 2020, he featured in the Jubin Nautiyal - Rochak Kohli song "Bewafa Tera Masoom Chehra". He received STAR Parivaar Award for 'Favourite Pati' (2015, 2011).

Personal life
Mehra was married to actress Nisha Rawal. He saw her on the sets of Hastey Hastey where he was styling.  After dating for six years, they married on 24 November 2012. Rawal found out that she was pregnant while he was in the Bigg Boss house. The couple had a son in 2017.

Domestic dispute 
A complaint of domestic violence was filed against Mehra by Rawal on 31 May 2021 in Mumbai's Goregaon police station after the latter arrived with a bleeding forehead. Mehra was subsequently arrested and released on bail. Later, Rawal claimed that Mehra had admitted to an extramarital affair with a Delhi girl while he was away on a shooting in Chandigarh. Divorce has been filed following the event, and the couple is separated as of March 2022.

Filmography

Television

Music videos

See also
 List of Indian television actors

References

External links

 
 

1982 births
Living people
Indian male television actors
Indian male soap opera actors
Bigg Boss (Hindi TV series) contestants
Apeejay School alumni
Punjabi people